Two is a Canadian drama series which aired in syndication from September 1996 to June 1997.  It featured Michael Easton as Gus McClain, a college professor from Seattle who is framed for the murder of his wife by his twin brother Booth Hubbard (Easton in a dual role).  Hubbard, whose existence had previously been unknown to McClain, committed several murders while assuming McClain's identity, leaving Gus on the run from the FBI.  Complicating matters more was that Booth had a brain tumor that could kill him at any moment and leave Gus without a way to clear himself. The primary FBI investigator in the case was Theresa "Terry" Carter (Barbara Tyson), whose partner was a victim of Hubbard and does not believe his claims of a twin brother. It featured Andrew Sikes as a recurring character trying to help McClain.

Due to low ratings, the show was canceled after one year.

Plot

Cast
Michael Easton...Gus McClain/Booth Hubbard
Barbara Tyson...Theresa "Terry" Carter

Episodes

External links

 

1990s Canadian drama television series
First-run syndicated television programs in the United States
1996 Canadian television series debuts
1997 Canadian television series endings
English-language television shows
Television shows filmed in Vancouver
Television series about the Federal Bureau of Investigation